The Dark Ride is the ninth studio album by German power metal band Helloween, released in 2000. The album's style was quite different from Better Than Raw as it had a much darker sound, drop-tuned guitars, and gruffer vocals. The album was produced by Roy Z and Charlie Bauerfeind. It is the last studio album to feature Master of the Rings-era lineup with the dismissal of guitarist Roland Grapow and drummer Uli Kusch after completion of the supporting tour for the album. They went on to form the band Masterplan.

The album contains two singles, which are "If I Could Fly" and "Mr. Torture".

On a later interview, bassist Markus Grosskopf commented on the album, saying: "The Dark Ride was kind of constructed, all the people were telling us try this, let's do this, you know, it's a good album but it's a very difficult way to do records when there's somebody always going on your nerves all the time."

Track listing

On some copies of "The Dark Ride" and "Rabbit Don't Come Easy" (as a special two for the price of one cd) the disc has "Mr. Torture" and "All Over the Nations" in reverse order so this way the latter is track #2. The tracks are also flipped on the Japanese version of the CD. Also on copies of the special two for one cd, there is a listing for track #13, "Far Away" on Rabbit Don't Come Easy, which does not exist on the CD and is a misprint on the back label.

Personnel
Andi Deris - vocals
Michael Weikath - guitar
Roland Grapow - guitar
Markus Grosskopf - bass
Uli Kusch - drums

Charts

References 

2000 albums
Helloween albums
Nuclear Blast albums
Albums produced by Charlie Bauerfeind
Albums produced by Roy Z